Amt Wachsenburg is a municipality in the district Ilm-Kreis, in Thuringia, Germany. The municipality is named after the Wachsenburg Castle which is located in its center. It was formed on 31 December 2012 from the former municipalities Wachsenburggemeinde and Ichtershausen. The former municipality Kirchheim was merged into Amt Wachsenburg in January 2019, and Rockhausen in December 2019. It consists of the villages Bechstedt-Wagd, Bittstädt, Eischleben, Haarhausen, Holzhausen, Ichtershausen, Kirchheim, Rehestädt, Rockhausen, Röhrensee, Sülzenbrücken, Thörey and Werningsleben.

References

Ilm-Kreis
Saxe-Coburg and Gotha